Izak Stephanus de Villiers 'Balie' Swart (born 18 May 1964), is a former South African rugby union player. He played as a prop, with the ability to prop on either side of the hooker.

Playing career
Swart is a product of Paarl Gimnasium and represented and captained the  Schools team at the 1983 Craven Week tournament. He also was selected for the South African Schools team in 1983, once again the captain. After school he played for the University of Stellenbosch before making his provincial debut for Western Province in 1987.

During 1992, he joined , now the Golden Lions and until 1999, playing over a hundred games for the union.

He had 16 caps for South Africa, from 1993 to 1996, never scoring. He was a member of the winning team at the 1995 World Cup finals, where he played in four games, including as tighthead prop in the 15–12 final win against the All Blacks. He also played in the first edition of the Tri Nations competition, in 1996. Swart also played in fifteen tour matches for the Springboks.

Test history 
 World Cup Final

Coaching career
In 2011 he started working for SA Rugby, assisting coaches and referees with scrum laws and later became involved with SANZAR, working with the referees.

See also
List of South Africa national rugby union players – Springbok no. 595
List of South Africa national under-18 rugby union team players

References

External links
Balie Swart International Statistics

1964 births
Living people
South African rugby union players
South Africa international rugby union players
South African rugby union coaches
Golden Lions players
Rugby union props
Lions (United Rugby Championship) players
Alumni of Paarl Gimnasium
Western Province (rugby union) players
Rugby union players from the Western Cape